Dongaseu is a Korean dish which consists of a breaded, deep-fried pork cutlet.

History 
The dish was introduced to Korea around 1930s during the period of Japanese rule, but the thick, Japanese-style tonkatsu failed to gain popularity.  became popular in the 1960s, with the spread of —light western food—restaurants. The dish, although called by the Japanese-derived name , followed Western pork cutlet recipes such as those of the Austrian —thinned by pounding before being breaded and deep-fried. It was not sliced, and served with bread. Western-style appetizer soup was served before the dish.  developed into two distinct varieties. In 1977, -style  with thin meat became a popular menu in —drivers' restaurant, similar to transport café, for taxi drivers—with the addition of chili peppers and kimchi as an accompaniment.

Preparation and serving 

Korean  is different from Japanese  in that it is thinner and often served unsliced, thus eaten with a knife and fork, not chopsticks, and is served with demi-glace on top of the fried meat (or in case of fish cutlet, tartar sauce on the fried fish). Alternatively, bread can replace rice, in which case Western-style soup is served before the main plate as an appetizer.

Variations 

See also 
 List of pork dishes

References 

Breaded cutlets
Deep fried foods
Korean fusion cuisine
Korean pork dishes